Sydney Shameless Shoemaker (September 29, 1931 – September 3, 2022) was an American philosopher. He was the Susan Linn Sage Professor of Philosophy at Cornell University and is well known for his contributions to philosophy of mind and metaphysics.

Education and career
Shoemaker graduated with a Bachelor of Arts from Reed College and earned his Doctor of Philosophy from Cornell University in 1958 under the supervision of Norman Malcolm. He taught philosophy at Ohio State University from 1957 to 1960 then, in 1961, returned to Cornell as a faculty member of the philosophy department.  In 1978 he was appointed the Susan Linn Sage Professor of Philosophy, a position he held until his retirement, as Professor Emeritus of Philosophy.

In 1971, he delivered the John Locke Lectures at Oxford University.

Shoemaker died on September 3, 2022, at the age of 90. He was buried in Greensprings Natural Cemetery Preserve in Newfield.

Philosophical work
Shoemaker worked primarily in the philosophy of mind and metaphysics, and published many classic papers in both of these areas (as well as their overlap). In "Functionalism and Qualia" (1975), for example, he argued that functionalism about mental states can account for the qualitative character (or 'raw feel') of mental states. In "Self-Reference and Self-Awareness" (1968), he argued that the phenomenon of absolute 'immunity to error through misidentification' is what distinguishes self-attributions of mental states (such as "I see a canary") from self-attributions of physical states (such as "I weigh 200 pounds").

In metaphysics, he defended the view that laws are metaphysically necessary, a position that follows from his view of properties as clusters of conditional causal powers. He also applied his view of properties to the problem of mental causation. He also distinguished contributions to the literature on self-knowledge and personal identity, where he defended a Lockean psychological continuity theory in his influential paper "Persons and their Pasts". In his later work on the content of perception, he has argued for a distinctive version of representationalism.

Selected publications

Books 
 Self-Knowledge and Self-Identity (1963).
 Personal Identity (co-authored with Richard Swinburne) (1984).
 Identity, Cause and Mind: Philosophical Essays (1984).
 The First-Person Perspective, and other Essays (1996).
 Physical Realization (2007).

Articles
 1970, "Persons and their Pasts", American Philosophical Quarterly, pp.269–85.

See also
American philosophy
List of American philosophers

References

External links
 Links to some of Shoemaker's papers online

1931 births
2022 deaths
20th-century American male writers
20th-century American philosophers
20th-century essayists
21st-century American male writers
21st-century American philosophers
21st-century essayists
Action theorists
American male essayists
American male non-fiction writers
American philosophy academics
Analytic philosophers
American consciousness researchers and theorists
Cornell University alumni
Cornell University faculty
Epistemologists
Metaphysicians
Metaphysics writers
Ontologists
Philosophers from Idaho
Philosophers of mind
Philosophers of science
Reed College alumni
Writers from Boise, Idaho
Corresponding Fellows of the British Academy